Rodo Sayagues is an Uruguayan filmmaker, lyricist, and actor best known for his work as writer on the Fede Álvarez-directed films Evil Dead (2013) and Don't Breathe (2016), and for directing Don't Breathe 2 (2021).

Career 
After writing short films, Sayagues wrote his feature film debut, Evil Dead (2013), which serves as a remake to the 1981 film. He reteamed with Evil Dead director Fede Álvarez to write the 2016 horror film Don't Breathe. On May 3, 2016, Warner Bros. hired Sayagues and Álvarez to co-write the script for Monsterpocalypse. On October 11, 2016, Columbia Pictures acquired the rights to Incognito and hired Sayagues, Daniel Casey and Álvarez to write the screenplay. In July 2017, Sayagues and Álvarez were hired to produce an untitled techno thriller film, with Jason Eisener directing, from a script by Simon Barrett.

In November 2018, Sayagues and Álvarez were brought onboard to co-write the sequel to their 2013 film, Evil Dead. In September 2019, Sayagues and Álvarez were hired to co-write the 2022 Texas Chainsaw Massacre sequel. In January 2020, Sayagues was hired to direct and co-write the sequel Don't Breathe 2, making his directorial debut. The film was released on August 13, 2021. In April 2020, Sayagues signed on to produce the Lionsgate zombie film 16 States. In March 2023, it was announced that Sayagues and Álvarez would be co-writing an Alien film, for a release on Hulu.

Filmography

References

External links 
 

21st-century American male writers
21st-century American screenwriters
American male screenwriters
Horror film directors
Living people
Place of birth missing (living people)
Uruguayan film directors
Uruguayan screenwriters
Year of birth missing (living people)
Uruguayan film producers
21st-century Uruguayan writers
21st-century Uruguayan male writers
21st-century Uruguayan male actors